The 1987 Cheltenham Council election took place on 7 May 1987 to elect members of Cheltenham Borough Council in Gloucestershire, England. One third of the council was up for election. The Conservatives made gains and became the largest party, but the council stayed in no overall control.

After the election, the composition of the council was:
Conservative 15
SDP–Liberal Alliance 14
Labour 2
Residents Associations 2

Election result

Ward results

References

Cheltenham
Cheltenham Borough Council elections
1980s in Gloucestershire